is a passenger railway station located in the city of Hannan, Osaka Prefecture, Japan, operated by the private railway operator Nankai Electric Railway. It has the station number "NK37".

Lines

Layout
The station has two island platforms connected by an elevated station building.

Platforms

Adjacent stations

History
Ozaki Station opened on 9 November 1897.

Passenger statistics
In fiscal 2019, the station was used by an average of 10,438 passengers daily.

Surrounding area
 Hannan City Culture Center
 Hannan City Hall
 Hannan Municipal Hospital

See also
 List of railway stations in Japan

References

External links

  

Railway stations in Japan opened in 1897
Railway stations in Osaka Prefecture
Hannan, Osaka